A medical bag (doctor's bag, physician's bag) is a portable bag used by a physician or other medical professional to transport medical supplies and medicine.

Traditionally, the medical bag was made of leather, opened on the top with a split-handle design. During the American Civil War, physician's medical saddle bags were used. Modern medical bags are made of various materials and come in various designs that can include many pockets, pouches, and zippered or hook-and-loop openings.

Indigenous North American medicine men and shamans use a medicine bag. A battle bag is used in the military.

Popular culture

The original Wonder Woman comic book character carried a medical bag (as a Lt. Nurse) in which she carried her costume and accessories.

In 1955, the MV Joyita charter boat was found partially submerged after being missing for 5 weeks. Among the items found onboard was a doctor's bag containing a stethoscope, a scalpel, and four lengths of blood-stained bandages.

In the television sitcom The Beverly Hillbillies (1962–1971), Granny Clampett is a backwoods doctor who has a medical bag.

Doctor Ross (Charles Isaiah Ross, 1925–1993) was an American blues musician nicknamed "Doctor" because of his habit of carrying his harmonicas in a black bag that resembled a doctor's bag.

"The Little Black Bag" is a short story by American science fiction author Cyril M. Kornbluth, first published in July 1950, about a disgraced doctor who comes across a medical bag from over a century in the future. It is the basis for a segment by the same name of Rod Serling's Night Gallery which aired December 23, 1970.

In 1956, Lynn Pressman Raymond (of the Pressman Toy Corporation) created the "Doctor Bag" toy to help children feel more comfortable with visits to the doctor. Seeing the anxiety of her children on visits to the doctor due to ill health or for vaccinations, she created the Doctor Bag—which included a stethoscope, syringe, and other pretend medical supplies—to help kids deal with their fears.

In the 1984 film Crimes of Passion, the "Reverend" Peter Shayne (played by Anthony Perkins) carries a doctor's bag full of sex toys.

The main character of 1990s television series Northern Exposure, Dr. Joel Fleishman, carries a medical bag when making housecalls.

Books about doctor's bags include What's in a Doctor's Bag? by Neil B. Shulman and Sibley Fleming, and My Doctor's Bag (2002) by Anne Millard.

Some video games, such as the Battlefield series (2002–present) and Fallout: New Vegas (2010), use medical bags to increase the player's health.

The ITV British police drama Heartbeat 2006 episode "Dead Men Do Tell Tales" is about a nurse, Carol Cassidy (played by Lisa Kay), who rushes off to treat an emergency, but absent-mindedly leaves her medical bag in her car which contains dangerous drugs; Carol has to fight for her career when local boys steal the bag.

Throughout the series House M.D., each time that Dr. House had his fellows break-into a patient's home to check for environmental toxins they each brought a medical bag with them containing (in addition to medical testing supplies), breaking and entering equipment.

In 2011, the New York Times reported that the Susan B. Anthony House museum had sold a large quantity of "a $250 handbag made of fake alligator that was inspired by one of Anthony’s own club bags, similar to a doctor’s bag," noting that for Anthony, "a bag was not a fashion statement but a symbol of independence at a time when women were not allowed to enter into a contract or even open a bank account."

See also
 First aid kit
 Gladstone bag

References

External links

 Doctor Bag Project - What's in the bag?, a glimpse into a doctor's bag from a typical late 1880s rural doctor, Indiana Medical History Museum
 Series 13 - Medical bags, cases and other containers (with or without contents), Medical History Museum, University of Melbourne

Bags
Medical equipment